Daniel Mkandawire (born 26 December 1951) is a Malawian former high jumper and triple jumper.

Daniel competed in the men's high jump at the 1972 Summer Olympics in Munich, where he finished in 36th place with a height of 1.90 metres. He also holds the Malawian national record for the triple jump with a distance of 14.30 metres which he set in 1970.

References

1951 births
Living people
Malawian male high jumpers
Olympic athletes of Malawi
Athletes (track and field) at the 1972 Summer Olympics